Statistics of Belgian First Division in the 1968–69 season.

Overview

It was contested by 16 teams, and Standard Liège won the championship.

League standings

Results

References

Belgian Pro League seasons
Belgian
1968–69 in Belgian football